The Neptune Theatre is the largest professional theatre company in Atlantic Canada with a capacity of 458 and is located in downtown Halifax, Nova Scotia, Canada. It performs a mixture of new and classical plays.  It is named after the play Théâtre de Neptune, which was performed at Port Royal, Nova Scotia as the first theatrical production in North America.

The Neptune was originally opened on the site of a former cinema in 1963 during Canada's drive to create regional theatres. Its first Artistic Director was Leon Major, later to become the Artistic Director of Boston Lyric Opera and Cleveland Opera. Its first President of the Board was local surgeon and CBC writer Dr. Arthur L. Murphy. The building was renovated in 1997 and now has two theatres and incorporates a theatre school.

From April to July 2007, the theatre staged its longest running production Beauty and the Beast. The play was performed 127 times, breaking a record previously held by Cats in 2004. Beauty and the Beast was directed by Ron Ulrich and starred Julie Martell as Belle and George Masswohl as the Beast. It also featured Rejean Cournoyer, Martha Irving, and Hank Stinson.

The most successful play of the 2008/2009 season was the comedy Skin Flick.  This production marked the second time Neptune presented a mainstage play by Canada's most successful playwright, Norm Foster, after the 2008 production The Love List. The production was directed by Walter Learning.

For their final production of 2009, Neptune Theatre produced the Canadian Premiere of the stage adaptation of the Disney sensation High School Musical, directed by Canadian director/choreographer David W. Connolly. Starring the three actors from the hit children's series The Doodlebops, along with Aaron Kyte and Elena Juatco, the production premiered 17 April 2009 and broke several box office records for the theatre.

Artistic directors

 Leon Major (founder, first artistic director, 1963–68)
 Heinar Piller (1969–1970)
 Robert Sherrin (1971–74)
 John Wood (1974–77)
 David Renton (1977–78)
 John Neville (1978–83)
 Tom Kerr (1983–86)
 Richard Ouzounian (1986–89)
 Linda Moore (1990–2000)
 Ron Ulrich (2000–2008)
 George Pothitos (2008–2017)
 Jeremy Webb (2017–present)

Further reading
  ( Book Review )

References

External links
 Official Site
 Recorded memory of theatre life in Nova Scotia Project

Theatres in Nova Scotia
Theatre companies in Nova Scotia
Buildings and structures in Halifax, Nova Scotia
Culture of Halifax, Nova Scotia
Music venues in Halifax, Nova Scotia